Diplacodes deminuta is a species of dragonfly in the family Libellulidae known commonly as the little percher or tiny percher. It is native to much of Central Africa, where it is widespread. It lives in swampy habitat. As a species it is not generally threatened, but it is affected by human activity, such as spraying for tsetse fly control.

References

Libellulidae
Insects described in 1969
Taxonomy articles created by Polbot